Giovanni Battista Pagliari (1741- January 8, 1816) was an Italian painter and art restorer.

He restored the Circumcision painted by Boccaccio Boccaccino for the Cremona Cathedral. In 1810, he restored the Martyrdom of St Thomas, Archbishop of Canterbury (1657), originally by Giovanni Battista Natali, found at the church of San Pietro in Cremona.

References

18th-century Italian painters
Italian male painters
19th-century Italian painters
Painters from Cremona
1741 births
1816 deaths
19th-century Italian male artists
18th-century Italian male artists